Amphisbaena talisiae is a species of worm lizard found in Brazil.

References

talisiae
Reptiles described in 1995
Endemic fauna of Brazil
Reptiles of Brazil
Taxa named by Paulo Vanzolini